The ninth South American Championship was held in Buenos Aires, Argentina from 29 November to 25 December 1925.

In 1925, the participating countries were Argentina, Brazil, and Paraguay. Chile and Uruguay withdrew from the tournament, making this event the one with the fewest participating teams. The tournament was rescheduled to be held in two rounds.

Argentina won its second continental title.

Squads
For a complete list of participants squads see: 1925 South American Championship squads

Venues

Final round
Each team played two matches against each of the other teams. Two points were awarded for a win, one point for a draw, and zero points for a defeat.

Result

Goal scorers

6 goals
  Manuel Seoane

4 goals

  Lagarto
  Nilo

2 goals

  Arthur Friedenreich
  Gerardo Rivas

1 goal

  Antonio Cerrotti
  Alfredo Garasini
  Juan C. Irurieta
  Martín Sánchez
  Domingo Tarasconi
  Filo 
  Manuel Fleitas Solich
  Luis Fretes

Aftermath
Despite having won the tournament unbeaten, part of the Argentine media considered the team's performance as "poor", highlighting that Argentina was the winner only because of being stronger than the other two participants. Argentine magazine El Gráfico stated Argentina's virtues were decreasing as the competition went by, with such notable failures.

Centre forward Juan Carlos Irurieta was injured in the first match, being replaced by Manuel Seoane, who did not play as good as he used to be because of his change of position (from left insider to centre forward). The media criticised hardly the performances of Garasini, Alejandro de los Santos, Antonio Cerrotti and Juan Bianchi. On the other hand, Domingo Tarasconi, Seoane and Martín Sánchez were mentioned as the most remarkable players. In the case of Tarasconi, his efficient dribbling, passing style and accurate corner kicks were widely praised. Seoane's goalscoring prowess was also mentioned as one of the high points of Argentina, setting a record with six goals in four matches. Nevertheless, Seoane was also criticised for being out of shape due to his overweight.

Another Argentine player harshly criticised was goalkeeper Américo Tesoriere:

References

 
1925
1925
1925 in South American football
1925 in Argentine football
1925 in Brazilian football
1925 in Paraguayan football
1925
November 1925 sports events
December 1925 sports events
1925
1920s in Buenos Aires